Unit 42 is a Belgian television series written by Julie Bertrand, Annie Carels and Charlotte Joulia. It premiered in Belgium on La Une on 19 November 2017, and it was released worldwide on Netflix on 14 June 2019.

After The Break and Public Enemy, Unit 42 came out of the second joint call for projects between RTBF and the Wallonia-Brussels Federation.

Synopsis 
A Federal Police unit fights against new forms of cybercrime. Members include:
 Billie, a hacker, codename: “Th3m1s”;
 Sam, a widowed family man;
 Nassim;
 Bob;
 Alice, a deaf Pathologist.

Cast

Main cast
Patrick Ridremont as Sam Leroy
Constance Gay as Billie Vebber
 as Bob Franck 
 Roda Fawaz as Nassim Khaoulani
 Danitza Athanassiadis as Alice Meerks
 Thomas Demarez as Tom Leroy
 Simon Caudry as Robin Leroy
 Caroline Stas as Camille Leroy
 Nola Tilman as Emmy Leroy
 Hélène Theunissen as Hélène Janssen

Series 1
 Tania Garbarski as Manuela Desmet  
 Anne-Pascale Clairembourg as Sandra Magnot
  as Dianne Wauters
  as Léon Neefs
 Alain Eloy as Henri Ravet 
  as Lambert Hammers 
 Bastiste Sornin as Michel Van Deck 
 Olivier Bonjour as Dominic Dalmot
 Christophe Lambert as Le Ravisseur
 Adonis Danieletto as Marc Descamps

Series 2
 Mirza Kilic as Jocelyn

Production information 
 Original title: Unité 42
 Director: Indra Siera (4 episodes), Mathieu Mortelmans (4 episodes), Roel Mondelaers (3 episodes), Hendrik Moonen (7 episodes)
 Screenplay: Charlotte Joulia, Julie Bertrand, Annie Carels, Sammy Fransquet and Anne-Charlotte Kassab
 Costumes: Vanessa Evrard
 Photography: Sander Vandenbroucke
 Editing: Marc de Coster, Philippe Ravoet and Steven Sanders
 Makeup: Elodie Lienard, Juan-Carlos Salazar, Valérie Tomasi
 Special Effects Makeup: Lionel Lê
 Music: Michel Duprez and Thierry Plas
 Producers: John Engel (producer/executive producer); Marie Queffeulou (associate producer); Christelle Mahy (line producer)
 Production companies: Left Field Ventures, Steel Fish Pictures, RTBF
 Country of origin: 
 Original language: French
 Genre: Crime drama, thriller
 Duration: 52 minutes
 Release dates:
 Season 1:
Belgium: 19 November 2017 on La Une, 7 October 2019 on VRT
 France: 15 January 2018 on France 2 
Switzerland: 12 April 2018 on RTS Un
Germany and Austria: November 2018 - January 2019 on Sony Channel (German TV channel) (dubbed in German)
 Season 2:
 Belgium: 3 November 2019 on La Une and Auvio3

Series overview

Episodes

Season 1 (2017)

Season 2 (2019) 
Season 2 was produced in 2019 and aired on RTBF La Une on 3 November 2019 after its first exclusive run on Belgian payTV platform Proximus.

References

External links 
 
 
 
 Les 7 clés d'Unité 42, la nouvelle série belge

2017 Belgian television series debuts
2010s Belgian television series
Belgian crime television series
Television shows set in Belgium
French-language Netflix original programming
French-language television programming in Belgium
La Une original programming